The skyline of Virginia Beach remained relatively low- to mid-rise until the 2000s which brought the construction of the 23-story Armada Hoffler Tower in 2002.

The Westin Virginia Beach Town Center took the top spot from Armada Hoffler Tower when it was completed in 2008 with 38 stories along the newly revitalized Virginia Beach Town Center. The Westin Virginia Beach Town Center has been the tallest building in the city and Virginia since completion in 2008.

The city has two skylines: One at Town Center and one at the Oceanfront. The following ranking is a compilation of both.

Tallest buildings

This lists ranks the tallest skyscrapers over 200 feet tall in Virginia Beach, Virginia, based on standard height measurement. This includes spires and architectural details but does not include antenna masts. The "Year" column indicates the year in which a building was completed.

Timeline of tallest buildings

Tallest under construction, approved, and proposed

This lists buildings that are approved for construction in Virginia Beach and are planned to rise at least .
completed.

See also
 List of tallest buildings in Virginia

External links
Virginia Beach | Buildings | EMPORIS
Clark Nexsen Tower, Virginia Beach - SkyscraperPage.com

Tallest in Virginia Beach
Buildings and structures in Virginia Beach, Virginia